Bois d'Arc is a tiny unincorporated community in Anderson County, in the U.S. state of Texas. According to the Handbook of Texas, only 10 people lived in Bois d'Arc in 2000. It is a part of the Palestine, Texas micropolitan area. It has been termed a ghost town by www.TexasEscapes.com.

History
Bois d'Arc had a church, only one business, and several scattered homes along the road. It then became a small crossroads community with only two businesses, a church, and several houses. Only 10 people resided in the settlement in 2000. In the late 1980s, there was a Southern Baptist church, a couple of small stores, and only one house in the community. There was one Osage Orange (Bois d'Arc) tree in that house's backyard. A Baptist church was established in 1914.

Geography
There are several houses in the community, with approximately 22 houses within a 1-mile radius. There are rolling hills with many varieties of oak, gum, and pine trees. There are only two known Bois d'Arc trees left in the community.

Demographics
The Baptist Church has a membership of over 300, with an average attendance of 90-100. Mostly Anglo residents live in the community, but there are a few Hispanic families as well. The locals raise cattle, horses, and goats.

Education
Bois d'Arc had a school in the 1930s and enrolled 45 students in 1932. It was consolidated with the school in Montalba in 1955. Today the community is served by the Cayuga Independent School District.

References

External links
Bois d'Arc's page on TexasEscapes.com

Unincorporated communities in Anderson County, Texas
Unincorporated communities in Texas